Amphisbaena tiaraju is a worm lizard species in the family Amphisbaenidae. It is endemic to Brazil.

References

tiaraju
Reptiles described in 2019
Endemic fauna of Brazil
Reptiles of Brazil